Proctonemesia is a genus of Brazilian jumping spiders that was first described by M. J. Bauab V. & B. A. M. Soares in 1978.  it contains only two species, found only in Brazil: P. multicaudata and P. secunda.

References

Salticidae genera
Endemic fauna of Brazil
Salticidae
Spiders of Brazil